The Legislative Council of the Hong Kong Special Administrative Region (LegCo) is the unicameral legislature of Hong Kong. It sits under China's "one country, two systems" constitutional arrangement, and is the power centre of Hong Kong's hybrid representative democracy, though popular representation in the legislature has diminished significantly in recent years, along with its political diversity.

The functions of the Legislative Council are to enact, amend or repeal laws; examine and approve budgets, taxation and public expenditure; and raise questions on the work of the government. In addition, the Legislative Council also has the power to endorse the appointment and removal of the judges of the Court of Final Appeal and the Chief Judge of the High Court, as well as the power to impeach the Chief Executive of Hong Kong.

Following the 2019–2020 Hong Kong protests, the National People's Congress disqualified several opposition councilors and initiated an electoral overhaul in 2021. The current Legislative Council consists of three groups of constituencies—geographical constituencies (GCs), functional constituencies (FCs), and Election Committee constituencies—and has been dominated by the pro-Beijing camp since an opposition walkout in 2020. The 2021 changes resulted in a drop in the share of directly elected representatives from 50% to 22% and an increase in the overall number of seats from 70 to 90, along with the establishment of a screening committee to vet candidates.

The original two groups (GCs and FCs) had constitutional significance. Government bills requires a simple majority of the council for passage, whereas private member bills requires simple majorities in two discrete divisions of geographical members and functional members for passage. Therefore, the directly elected legislators (mainly from the GCs) had minimal influence over government policy and legislative agenda.

The historical Legislative Council of Hong Kong in the British colonial era was created under the 1843 Charter as an advisory council to the Governor. The authority of the colonial legislature expanded throughout its history. A parallel Provisional Legislative Council was put in place by China from 1996 to 1998 to pass laws in anticipation of the Hong Kong handover.

History

Colonial period
The Legislative Council of Hong Kong was set up in 1843 for the first time as a colonial legislature under British rule. Hong Kong's first constitution, in the form of Queen Victoria's letters patent, issued on 27 June 1843 and titled the Charter of the Colony of Hong Kong, authorised the establishment of the Legislative Council to advise the Governor of Hong Kong's administration. The council had four official members including the governor who was president of the council when it was first established. The Letters Patent of 1888, which replaced the 1843 charter, added the significant words "and consent" after the words "with the advice". The Legislative Council was initially set up as the advisory body to the governor, and for the most of the time, consisted half of official members, who were the government officials seated in the council, and half of unofficial members who were appointed by the Governor.

After the Sino-British Joint Declaration was signed on 19 December 1984 (in which the United Kingdom agreed to transfer the sovereignty of Hong Kong to the People's Republic of China on 1 July 1997), the Hong Kong government decided to start the process of democratisation based on the consultative document, Green Paper: the Further Development of Representative Government in Hong Kong on 18 July 1984. The first elections to the Council were held in 1985, followed by the first direct elections of the Legislative Council held in 1991. The Legislative Council became a fully elected legislature for the first time in 1995 and extensively expanded its functions and organisations throughout the last years of the colonial rule.

The People's Republic of China government did not agree with reforms to the Legislative Council enacted by the last Governor Chris Patten in 1994. Therefore, it withdrew the previous so-called "through-train" policy that would have allowed for members elected to the colonial Legislative Council automatically becoming members of the Hong Kong Special Administrative Region (HKSAR) legislature. Instead, the Beijing government resolved to set up an alternative legislative council in preparation for the return of Hong Kong sovereignty from Britain to China.

Before the 1997 transfer of sovereignty of Hong Kong, rather than working through the 1995 elected colonial legislature, the government of China, through the Preparatory Committee for the Hong Kong Special Administrative Region (HKSAR), unilaterally established, in 1996, the Provisional Legislative Council (PLC) in Shenzhen, under the National People's Congress of the People's Republic of China. The Provisional Legislative Council, seen as unconstitutional by the British authorities and boycotted by most pro-democracy legislators, was in operation from 25 January 1997 to 30 June 1998 and held its meetings in Shenzhen until 30 June 1997, when the PLC moved to Hong Kong and replaced the elected legislature from the 1997 handover of Hong Kong until the 1998 Hong Kong legislative election. Since 2000, the terms of the Legislative Council have been four years, with the exception of the 6th Legislative Council.

Early SAR years
The current HKSAR Legislative Council was established on 1 October 1998 under the Hong Kong Basic Law. The first meeting of the council was held in July of the same year. Five subsequent Legislative Council elections have been held — the most recent being held on 4 September 2016. The Democratic Party had briefly held the largest-party status in the early years of the SAR period, but its support was slowly eaten away by its pro-democracy allies such as The Frontier and later the Civic Party. In the 2004 election, the pro-Beijing Democratic Alliance for the Betterment of Hong Kong (DAB) surpassed the Democrats as the largest party for the first time and has since held its superior status. Due to the indirectly elected trade-based functional constituencies which largely favour business interests — represented by the Liberal Party and subsequently the Business and Professionals Alliance for Hong Kong (BPA) — the pro-Beijing camp has been able to keep the majority in the legislature despite receiving fewer votes than the pro-democracy bloc in the direct elections.

Article 68 of the Hong Kong Basic Law states that the ultimate aim is the election of all the members of the Legislative Council by universal suffrage. This and a similar article dealing with election of the Chief Executive have made universal suffrage for the council and the Chief Executive a dominant issue in Hong Kong politics.

In 2010, the government's constitutional reform proposal became the first and only constitutional move to have been passed by the Legislative Council in the SAR era with the support of the Democratic Party after the Beijing government accepted the modified package as presented by the party, which increased the composition of the Legislative Council from 60 to 70 seats; adding five seats in the directly elected geographical constituencies and five new District Council (Second) functional constituency seats which are nominated by the District Councillors and elected by all registered electorates. The 2014 Hong Kong electoral reform proposal, which suggested the electoral method of the Legislative Council remain unchanged, was vetoed in 2015, after a massive occupation protest demanding universal suffrage — often dubbed the "Umbrella Revolution" — broke out in 2014.

The 2016 New Territories East by-election and September general election saw the rise of localist tide where a number of pro-independence candidates were elected to the council. In November, in Beijing's fifth interpretation of the Basic Law since the 1997 handover, the National People's Congress Standing Committee (NPCSC) disqualified two pro-independence legislators from assuming public office pursuant to Article 104. Four more pro-democracy and localist legislators were unseated in subsequent court cases. Returning officers also disqualified certain candidates who had advocated for Hong Kong self-determination, with or without option for independence, from running in the following by-elections; the government expressed support for such decisions.

2019 crisis and 2021 overhaul

The 2019 amendment of the extradition bill caused an historic political upheaval, where intensive protests erupted throughout the city in the latter half of the year, including the storming of the Legislative Council Complex on the 22nd anniversary of the handover of Hong Kong on 1 July. In July 2020, in light of the pro-democrats' attempt to seize the majority of the Legislative Council in the midst of the largely unpopular Carrie Lam government, the government postponed the seventh general election, citing the COVID-19 spike. At variance with the four-year term set out in the Basic Law, the NPCSC decided in August that the sitting Legislative Council should continue with its duties for at least one year; however, the term of the upcoming LegCo would remain four years. In a November decision, the NPCSC disqualified LegCo members on grounds such as Hong Kong independence, Chinese sovereignty, and solicitation of foreign intervention, impacting four sitting legislators whose candidacies had been invalidated in the postponed election. After the disqualification, the 15 remaining pro-democracy legislators announced their resignation in protest, leaving the legislature with virtually no opposition.

On 27 January 2021, CCP general secretary Xi Jinping said that Hong Kong could only maintain its long-term stability and security by ensuring "patriots governing Hong Kong" when he reviewed a work report delivered by Carrie Lam. In March 2021, China's National People's Congress passed a resolution that authorised an overhaul of Hong Kong's electoral system, including that of the Legislative Council. The reform would allow a new Candidate Eligibility Review Committee, composed entirely of principal officials from the Hong Kong government, to vet candidates for the Legislative Council and would increase its total number of seats from 70 to 90. However, the seats that were directly elected would be reduced from 35 to 20, the five directly elected District Council (Second) seats would also be removed, while an additional 40 seats would be elected by the pro-Beijing Election Committee and 30 seats would remain trade-based functional constituencies. Every candidate must have nominations from each of the five sectors in the Election Committee.

The seventh Legislative Council term, beginning in January 2022, made changes where lawmakers' names were replaced with "a member" or "members" in meeting minutes, a change which the Hong Kong Journalists Association said was negative and that "One one hand, that would make it more difficult for the public to hold lawmakers accountable, and therefore affect how voters may vote."

The Legislative Council Building

The first meetings of the Legislative Council of Hong Kong, from 1844 to 1846, were likely convened in the residence of Governor Pottinger (later to be the French Mission Building), still standing at Government Hill. From 1848 to 1954 (interrupted by renovation in 1928-9 and the Japanese occupation in 1941–5), it was housed on the upper floor of the Colonial Secretariat Building, Lower Albert Road, replaced in 1957 by the Annex to the Central Government Offices Main Wing, on the same site. In 1985, LegCo moved down to the nearby Old Supreme Court building in Central Hong Kong where it remained until November 2011. It took up residence in its present accommodation at the Legislative Block of the Central Government Complex, Tamar in December 2011.

Unlike many other former and current Commonwealth legislatures, the Hong Kong Legislative Council does not have a ceremonial mace placed in its chambers. However, the high courts of Hong Kong use a mace to open sessions, and it represents the authority and powers of the court.

To provide a long-term solution to the space shortage problem facing both the Government and the Legislative Council, the Government commissioned the Tamar Development for the design and construction of the Central Government Complex, the Legislative Council Complex and other ancillary facilities in 2008. The Legislative Council Complex comprises a low block and a high block: the low block, which will be named the Council Block, mainly houses conference facilities including the Chamber, major conference rooms, and communal facilities such as library, cafeteria and education facilities. The range of education facilities for visit by the public includes video corner, visitors' sharing area, exhibition area, children's corner, viewing gallery and access corridors, memory lane, education activities rooms and education galleries. The high block, which will be named as the Office Block, mainly houses offices for members and staff of the Legislative Council Secretariat. Officially opened on 1 August 2011, administrative staff had already taken occupation on 15 January 2011.

Membership composition

Under the 2021 Hong Kong electoral changes initiated by the National People's Congress, the Legislative Council is now composed of 90 members returned from 3 constituencies: the Election Committee Constituency, Functional Constituencies and Geographical Constituencies by popular vote.

The term of office of a member is constitutionally four years except for the first term (1998 to 2000) which was set to be two years according to Article 69 of the Basic Law. The 6th Legislative Council's term of office of over five years from 2016 is in direct violation of Article 69 of the Basic Law.

In both the 2008 and 2004 elections, 30 members were directly elected by universal suffrage from geographical constituencies (GCs) and 30 were elected from functional constituencies (FCs). In the 2000 election, 24 were directly elected, six elected from an 800-member electoral college known as the Election Committee of Hong Kong, and 30 elected from FCs. Since the 2004 election, all the seats are equally divided between geographical and functional constituencies.

According to The Basic Law, while the method for forming the Legislative Council shall be specified in accordance with the principle of gradual and orderly progress, the ultimate aim is to elect all Council members by universal suffrage (Article 68 of The Basic Law of Hong Kong). However, under the 2021 overhaul, the seats that were directly elected would be reduced from 35 back down to 20, the five directly elected District Council (Second) seats would also be removed, while an additional 40 seats would be elected by the Beijing-controlled Election Committee and 30 seats would remain trade-based functional constituencies, reducing the proportion of directly elected seats from 50% to 22%. Additionally all candidates must now be approved by the unelected HKSAR government via the Candidate Eligibility Review Committee. This has led to all parties that are not pro-Beijing declining to run in the elections, as it is now reasonable to assume that any pro-democracy candidates fielded that might be electable will be disqualified prior to the election.

Geographical constituencies

The Geographical Constituency (GC) seats are returned by universal suffrage. 20 seats of the Legislative Council are returned by GCs through single non-transferable vote with a district magnitude of 2 ("binomial system"). The binomial system was instituted by the Standing Committee of the National People's Congress in its amendment to Annex 2 of the Basic Law on 30 March 2021.

Geographical constituencies were first introduced in Hong Kong's first legislative election with direct elections in 1991. The electoral system and boundaries of GCs have since changed:

Between 1998 and 2016, the voting system adopted in GCs is a system of party-list proportional representation, with seats allocated by the largest remainder method using the Hare quota as the quota for election.

Functional constituencies
Under the 2021 Hong Kong electoral changes, 28 functional constituencies (FC) return 30 members. The Labour Functional Constituency returns three members by block voting. The other FCs return one member each with first-past-the-post voting.

The 2021 electoral reform saw the dissolution of District Council (First) and District Council (Second) FCs. 3 existing FCs were reconstituted: the Information Technology FC reorganised as the Technology & Innovation FC; the Medical FC and Health Services FC combined to form the Medical and Health Services FC. 2 new FCs were established, namely the Commercial (Third) and the HKSAR Deputies to the National People's Congress, HKSAR Members of the National Committee of the Chinese People's Political Consultative Conference, and Representatives of Relevant National Organisations FCs. Functional constituencies are now principally elected by body votes; the number of FCs with individual votes were reduced, together with elimination of mixed individual and body voting systems.

The following FCs were abolished in the 2021 electoral reform.

 Medical
 Health Services
 Information Technology
 District Council (First)
 District Council (Second)

Between 1998 and 2016, the Heung Yee Kuk, Agriculture and Fisheries, Insurance, and Transport FCs where a preferential elimination system is used due to the small number of voters. In the preferential elimination system, a voter must indicate preferences rather than approval/disapproval or a single choice. District Council (Second) uses the same voting rule in Geographical constituencies for the 5 seats.

Before the 2021 elections, neither the Heung Yee Kuk nor the Commercial (Second) FCs have held an actual election, as only one candidate has stood for each FC in every election since their establishment in 1991 and 1985, respectively.

Election Committee Constituency

The Election Committee constituency was one of the three constituencies designed in the Basic Law of Hong Kong next to the directly elected geographical constituencies and the indirectly elected functional constituencies for the first and second-term  Legislative Council in the early SAR period. With the last British Governor Chris Patten's electoral reform, the ECC was composed of all elected District Board members who had been elected in 1994. The Single Transferable Vote system was used in the 1995 election.

After the handover of Hong Kong, the ECC was allocated 10 seats out of the total 60 seats in the SAR Legislative Council, comprising all members of the Election Committee which also elected the Chief Executive every five years. The size of the constituency reduced to six seats in 2000 and was entirely abolished and replaced by the directly elected geographical constituency seats in the 2004 election. The plurality-at-large voting system was used in 1998 and 2000.

In the 2021 electoral overhaul, the Election Committee constituency was reintroduced, taking 40 of the 90 seats, almost half, of the Legislative Council with plurality-at-large voting system. The electorate is composed of all newly expanded 1,500 members in the Election Committee.

Committee system
In order to perform the important functions of scrutinizing bills, approving public expenditure and monitoring Government's work, a committee system is established.

Standing Committees 
 House Committee	
 Parliamentary Liaison Subcommittee
 Finance Committee
 Establishment Subcommittee
 Public Works Subcommittee
 Public Accounts Committee
 Committee on Members' Interests
 Committee on Rules of Procedure

Panels

 Panel on Administration of Justice and Legal Services
 Panel on Commerce and Industry
 Panel on Constitutional Affairs
 Panel on Development
 Panel on Economic Development
 Panel on Education
 Panel on Environmental Affairs
 Panel on Financial Affairs
 Panel on Food Safety and Environmental Hygiene
 Panel on Health Services
 Panel on Home Affairs
 Panel on Housing
 Panel on Information Technology and Broadcasting
 Panel on Manpower
 Panel on Public Service
 Panel on Security
 Panel on Transport
 Panel on Welfare Services

President of the Legislative Council

From the establishment of the Legislative Council in 1843 to 1993, the Governor was the President and a member of the council, and until 1917 the Governor was required to act with the advice but not necessary the consent of the Legislative Council. The Letters Patent of 1917 changed such practice by requiring the Governor to act "with advice and consent" of the Legislative Council.

Under the Basic Law (Article 72), the President has the powers and functions to preside over meetings, decide on the agenda, including giving priority to government bills for inclusion in the agenda, decide on the time of meetings, call special sessions during the recess, call emergency sessions on the request of the Chief Executive, and exercise other powers and functions as prescribed in the rules of procedure of the Legislative Council. However, the president of the legislative council may not vote in most situations regarding government bills, and is encouraged to remain impartial towards all matters in the LegCo. The President of the Legislative Council has to meet the eligibility requirements set out in the Basic Law that he or she shall be a Chinese citizen of not less than 40 years of age, who is a permanent resident of the HKSAR with no right of abode in any foreign country and has ordinarily resided in Hong Kong for a continuous period of not less than 20 years.

The President is elected by and from among Council members. The first President (1997–2008) was Rita Fan; the incumbent president, elected in 2016, is Andrew Leung of the pro-Beijing Business and Professionals Alliance for Hong Kong.

Primacy of President
In a controversial move directed at reining in democratic legislators (most of whom were elected by universal suffrage and six of whose seats had been vacated by a controversial court order of disqualification), amendments to the Rules of Procedure were passed on 15 December 2017 giving sweeping powers to the President to control the business of the legislature.  Among them is the power to vet proposed motions and amendments to bills, require legislators to explain them and to reject or merge them.  Prior notice must be given of any notice of motion and the President may reconvene the chamber immediately after any failure to meet quorum.

Procedure
The quorum for meetings of the council is half of all LegCo Members; while the quorum for meetings of a committee of the whole during second reading of bills  is 20, i.e. only 22 per cent of membership, having been reduced from 35 on 15 December 2017.

After the 15 December 2017 amendments to procedure, a petition is to be submitted to the House Committee only with at least 35 signatures of members, effectively blocking democrat-sponsored scrutiny of government action.

Passage of Bills 
Passage of bills introduced by the government require only a simple majority of votes of the members of the Legislative Council present; whereas passage of motions, bills or amendments to government bills introduced by individual LegCo members shall require a simple majority of votes of each of the two groups of members present: namely members returned by the Election Committee and members returned by functional constituencies and geographical constituencies.

Motions on amendments to the Basic Law require a two-thirds vote in the Legislative Council, without a specific requirement in each group of constituencies. After passing the council, the Basic Law amendment must obtain the consent of two-thirds of Hong Kong's deputies to the National People's Congress, and also the Chief Executive (the Chief Executive is vested with the veto power). The National People's Congress reserves the sole power to amend the Basic Law.

Traditionally, the President does not vote. However, this convention is not a constitutional requirement.

Elections of the Legislative Council

Legislative Council general elections are held every four years in accordance with Article 69 of the Basic Law of HKSAR. The  most recent election was held on 19 December 2021. The pro-Beijing camp had absolute control of the Legislative Council with the Democratic Alliance for the Betterment and Progress of Hong Kong (DAB) as the largest party.

Seating arrangement

In a typical Council meeting in the old Legislative chamber, members were seated to the left and front of the President's chair in the Chamber patterned after the adversarial layout of Westminster system legislatures. The three rows to the right were reserved for government officials and other people attending the meetings.

At the new LegCo site at Tamar, members sit facing the President (and council officers) in a hemicycle seating arrangement.

At present, the Secretariat, headed by the Secretary General, provides administrative support and services to the Council through its ten divisions. In addition to being the chief executive of the Secretariat, the Secretary General is also the Clerk to the Legislative Council responsible for advising the President on all matters relating to the procedure of the council.

List of Legislative Council compositions

The following lists the composition of Legislative Council seats since its establishment:

The following chart lists the composition of the Legislative Councils of Hong Kong since the Special Administrative Region (SAR) period from 1998, the composition and diagram indicate the seats controlled by the camps (green for the pro-democracy camp and red for the pro-Beijing camp) at the beginning of the sessions.

Officers of the Legislative Council 

Services to members were originally provided by the Office of the Clerk to the Legislative Council which was part of the Government Secretariat. Additional support later came from other administrative units, i.e. the Unofficial Members of the Executive and Legislative Councils (UMELCO) Secretariat and its variants, in consideration of the gradually rising volume of work in Council business.

With the establishment of UMELCO in 1963, public officers were seconded to UMELCO to assist members to deal with public complaints and build up public relations with the local community. During their secondments, public officers took instructions only from Council members. The practice remained when the Office of the Members of the Executive and Legislative Councils (OMELCO) replaced UMELCO in 1986.

In 1991, the OMELCO Secretariat was incorporated. As a result of the complete separation of membership of the Executive and Legislative Councils, OMELCO was renamed the Office of Members of Legislative Council (OMLEGCO).

The Legislative Council Commission, a statutory body independent of the Government, was established under The Legislative Council Commission Ordinance on 1 April 1994. The Commission integrated the administrative support and services to the council by the Office of the Clerk to the Legislative Council and the OMLEGCO Secretariat into an independent Legislative Council Secretariat. The Commission replaced all civil servants by contract staff in the 1994–1995 session.

See also 

 Commonwealth Association of Legislative Counsel
 Executive Council of Hong Kong
 List of Members of the Legislative Council of Hong Kong
 Politics of Hong Kong
 Senior Chinese Unofficial Member
 Senior Unofficial Member

Notes

References

Further reading
 
 Earlier version, updated as of October 2, 2020

External links 
Legislative Council of Hong Kong
Electoral Affairs Commission

 
Hong Kong
Hong Kong
1843 establishments in Hong Kong